The Brussels Carmel was a Discalced Carmelite convent in the city of Brussels, founded in 1607 by Ana de Jesús at the behest of the Archdukes Albert and Isabella. The church and convent were designed by Wenceslas Cobergher in an Italianate style inspired by the Roman church of Santa Maria in Traspontina. The monastery was suppressed in 1785.

References

Further reading
 Germaine de Jésus, Le Carmel royal de Bruxelles (Brussels, 1948)
 Charles Terlinden, "Le Carmel royal de Bruxelles (1607-1657)", Cahiers bruxellois 2 (1957), pp. 11–35.

Christian monasteries in Brussels
Carmelite monasteries in Belgium
1607 establishments in the Habsburg Netherlands
1785 disestablishments in the Habsburg monarchy
1785 disestablishments in the Holy Roman Empire
Disestablishments in the Austrian Netherlands
Christian monasteries established in the 17th century
Demolished buildings and structures in Belgium